Quetzalcóatl International Airport, also known as Nuevo Laredo International Airport, is an international airport located in Nuevo Laredo, Tamaulipas, Mexico. It is situated near the U.S.-Mexico border, opposite Laredo, Texas and handles national and international air traffic for the city of Nuevo Laredo. It is operated by Aeropuertos y Servicios Auxiliares, a federal government-owned corporation.

In 2021, the airport handled 53,921 passengers, and in 2022 it handled 107,368 passengers.

History
Quetzalcóatl International Airport was named after Quetzalcoatl from the Aztec Religion who was a benefactor god, considered a leader among the deities, that would return after his departure to take back the empire. Mexicana used to fly to Mexico City and Guadalajara before it ceased operations in 2010.

Airlines and destinations

Passengers

Cargo

Statistics

Passengers

See also 

 List of the busiest airports in Mexico

References

External links 
 Nuevo Laredo Intl. Airport

Airports in Tamaulipas
Nuevo Laredo